Kathryn Lance (November 26, 1943 – January 29, 2022) was an American writer in many fields of fiction and non-fiction under her own name and various pseudonyms, as well as being the ghostwriter for numerous books purportedly written by other people. She had written dozens of young adult novels in the science-fiction, mystery, and horror genres, many of them in series as by Lynn Beach. She had also written magazine articles and stories for both adults and children.  Her topics included diet, sports, fitness, sexuality, and biotechnology, in both corporate publications and such national periodicals as Family Circle, Parade, Self, Town & Country, Ladies Home Journal, and Writer's Digest.

Biography
Kathryn Lance was born in November 26, 1943, in El Paso, Texas. After growing up in Tucson, Arizona, Lance received degrees from the University of Arizona, including a master's in Russian. Moving to New York City in 1970, she initially wrote hundreds of scripts for the television soap operas Another World, Somerset, All My Children, and One Life to Live through 1973, then worked for Scholastic Magazines as associate editor until 1976. While there, she created and wrote The Halls of Haywood High, a successful teenage soap opera published biweekly in Senior Scholastic Magazine. In 1976 she published her first book, Running for Health and Beauty, which sold 500,000 copies in all editions. The first mass-market book about running, it is considered to have helped start the fitness boom.

She then turned to freelancing full-time, writing dozens of books, both fiction and nonfiction. Her first science-fiction novel for adults, Pandora’s Genes, was named to the Locus magazine Recommended list for 1986 and was chosen Best New Science Fiction of 1985 by Romantic Times.

Lance returned to Tucson in 1989, where she lived with her husband and four cats. In addition to writing, she had also taught novel-writing and other writing courses. Semi-retired in 2009, she wrote fiction and was a docent at Tohono Chul Park, leading nature walks. She was also a  member of the Science Fiction Writers of America and the Author’s Guild, and previously a board member of the American Society of Journalists and Authors.

Bibliography

Adult nonfiction books

Running for Health and Beauty. Bobbs-Merrill, 1977; Bantam, 1978.
Getting Strong. Bobbs-Merrill, 1978; Bantam, 1979. First mass-market book on weight training for women. More than 150,000 sold.
A Woman's Guide to Spectator Sports. A & W, 1980. Alternate selection of Book of the Month Club.
Total Sexual Fitness for Women, in collaboration with Maria Agardy. Rawson, Wade, 1981.
Sportsbeauty. Avon, 1984.
The Setpoint Diet, as by Dr. Gilbert Leveille (ghostwritten). Ballantine, 1985. New York Times Sunday paperback best-seller list for six weeks; over 400,000 printed.
Low-Impact Aerobics, Crown, 1988.
The Princeton Plan, as by Edwin Heleniak, M.D. and Barbara Aston, M.S. (ghostwritten). St. Martins, 1990.
The Body Code,  by Jay Cooper with Kathryn Lance. Pocket, 1999. Alternate Selection of Book of the Month Club.
The Botox Book, by Everett M. Lautin, M.D., and Suzanne M. Levine, D.P.M., and Kathryn Lance. M. Evans, 2002.
You Don’t Need Plastic Surgery, by Everett M. Lautin, M.D., and Suzanne M. Levine, D.P.M. and Kathryn Lance, M. Evans, 2003.
Heart and Soul: A Psychological and Spiritual Guide to Preventing  and Healing Heart Disease, as by Bruno Cortis,  M.D., (ghostwritten).  Villard, 1995; Pocket, 1996.
Unlocking the Animal Mind, by Franklin D. McMillan, D.V.M., with Kathryn Lance. Rodale, 2004.

Adult fiction 

"Barbara Ann,” short story based on her sister’s death, in Story: Yearbook of Discovery, 1968.
"Welcome to Valhalla," short story by Kathryn Lance and Jack McDevitt, Asimov’s Science Fiction, December, 2008.
Anthologized in Cryptic: The Best Short Fiction of Jack McDevitt, Subterranean Press, 2009.
Pandora's Genes. Questar, 1985. Winner, Best New Science Fiction Novel 1985, Romantic Times; Locus magazine Recommended List, 1986.
Smashwords and Kindle editions, 2011.
Pandora's Children. Questar, 1986.
Smashwords and Kindle editions, 2011.
The Ptorrigan Lode, novella, Smashwords and Kindle, 2011.

Young Adult and/or juvenile nonfiction
As written by Lynn Beach: Dozens of articles and booklets on science, health, nutrition, consumerism, technology, space exploration, lifestyles, in national and regional publications.

Young Adult and/or juvenile fiction 

Going to See Grassy Ella, Lothrop, Lee & Shepard, May, 1993. Named Recommended Book for Reluctant Young Readers 1994 by Young Adult Library Services Association of the American Library Association
German edition 1995.
Smashwords and Kindle editions, 2011.

As written by Lynn Beach
"Phantom Valley", a Young Adult paranormal mystery series comprising
The Evil One, Minstrel Books (Pocket), NYC, 1991
The Dark, Minstrel Books (Pocket), NYC, 1991
Scream of the Cat, Minstrel Books (Pocket), NYC, 1992
Stranger in the Mirror, Minstrel Books (Pocket), NYC, 1992
The Spell, Minstrel Books (Pocket), NYC, 1992
The Headless Ghost, Minstrel Books (Pocket), NYC, 1992
Dead Man’s Secret, Minstrel Books (Pocket), NYC, 1992
In the Mummy’s Tomb, Minstrel Books (Pocket), NYC, 1992
Curse of the Claw, Minstrel Books (Pocket), NYC, 1993

Others, under various names

Seven books in the "Give Yourself Goosebumps" series, Scholastic, 1995—1999
Twelve ghost-written Young Adult series novels for a single publisher, 1990–98
Night of the Werecat, in the "R.L. Stine's Ghosts of Fear Street" series, Minstrel Books (Pocket), 1997 and 1998.
Caution: Aliens at Work, in the "R.L. Stine's Ghosts of Fear Street" series, Minstrel Books (Pocket), 1997 and 1998.
Secrets of the Lost Island, Scholastic, NYC, 1985
The Haunted Castle of Ravencurse, Avon, NYC, 1985
Attack of the Insecticons, Ballantine, NYC, 1985
Conquest of the Time Master, Avon, NYC, 1986
Invasion from Darkland, Avon, NYC, 1986
Operation Jungle Doom, Random House, NYC, 1987
Operation Time Machine, Random House, NYC, 1987
Invisibility Island, Parachute Press, NYC, 1988

References

Attribution

External links
 Official website
 

1943 births
2022 deaths
20th-century American writers
20th-century American women writers
21st-century American writers
21st-century American women writers
Pseudonymous women writers
20th-century pseudonymous writers
21st-century pseudonymous writers
Writers from El Paso, Texas
Writers from Tucson, Arizona